The BARLA National Cup is a knock-out competition for amateur rugby league clubs in Great Britain. It is administered by the British Amateur Rugby League Association (BARLA).

The winners of the most recent staging of the competition in 2022 are Waterhead.

Past winners

See also

References

External links
 BARLA Official Website

BARLA competitions